Richard Bernard Kraynak (born January 20, 1961) is a former professional American football linebacker in the National Football League. He played five seasons for the Philadelphia Eagles (1983–1986) and the Atlanta Falcons (1987).

1961 births
Living people
People from Phoenixville, Pennsylvania
Players of American football from Pennsylvania
American football linebackers
Pittsburgh Panthers football players
Philadelphia Eagles players
Atlanta Falcons players
National Football League replacement players